Callaghan is a ranching community in Webb County, Texas and was established in 1881. The community was named after a nearby ranch owned by Charles Callaghan and much later Joe B. Finley. The community was once a cattle shipping point on the International and Great Northern Railroad. Callaghan is served by the Callaghan Ranch Airport (ICAO: 90TX). Callaghan is fourteen miles north of Laredo, Texas.

Geography

Callaghan is located at  (27.879444, -99.396667).

Education
Callaghan is served by the United Independent School District in Laredo.

References

Unincorporated communities in Webb County, Texas
Unincorporated communities in Texas
Populated places established in 1881
1881 establishments in Texas